Juan Esnard Heydrich (Matanzas 1917 – 1998) was a Cuban sculptor. His career took off in the 1970s with the new regime of Fidel Castro, who commissioned several monuments on the revolution and personalities of Cuban history.

He studied at the Escuela Nacional de Bellas Artes "San Alejandro", 1935 – 1940, and founded with Rafael Soriano, Manuel Rodulfo Tardo, Roberto Juan Diago Querol and José Felipe Nuñez the Provincial School of Fine Arts in Matanzas. He is second cousin of Swiss-Cuban painter Garbade and grandson of Fernando Heydrich, sculptor and founder of the aqueduct of Matanzas.

Works 
He was a successful sculptor, and his participation with the Juventudes Socialistas (Socialist Youth Organization) let him to be the commissioned the bust of Lieutenant General of the Liberation Army Antonio Maceo in the late 1950s. There were many technical problems, and Juan Esnard took advantage of his trip as a representative of Cuba in the Third World Congress of Youth and Students to Berlin 1951, to fuse the sculpture in stainless steel.

His ambition to dramatize political arguments is documented in his monument Nuestros muertos alcanzando los brazos. at the Museum-Memorial of Las Tunas. A human body is seen raising its clenched fist in a gesture of pain and force. It was a tribute for the 31st Anniversary of the Crime of Barbados. In this line of sculpting commemorative monuments, he made the sculptural ensemble in the Garden of the Vocational School of Exact Sciences Carlos Marx. Matanzas.

Exhibitions 
 Galería de Matanzas, Cuba,1951
 Museo Nacional de Cuba, Habana, 1970
 UNEAC, Habana, 1975
 Museo Nacional de Bellas Artes de La Habana, 1976
 La Tertulia Museum, Cali, Colombia, 1976
 Salón Nacional de Artes Plásticas, Havanna, 1979
 Museo Nacional, La Escultura en la Revolución,Habana, 1983

Awards 
 Premio Nacional de Escultura, UNEAC 78
 Secundo premio de Escultura, Salon de Arte, Havanna
 Distinción de la Cultura Cubana
 Distinción Raúl Gómez García.

Monuments 
 Monument  José Martí, Auras, 1942
 Monument Las madres, 1954
 Monument José Martí, Matanzas
 Monument Nuestros muertos alzando los brazos in the gardens of the  Matanzas

References 

Cuban sculptors
People from Matanzas Province
Cuban contemporary artists
1917 births
1998 deaths
Academia Nacional de Bellas Artes San Alejandro alumni